John Allan (born 25 November 1963) is a former Scotland international rugby union player; and later a former South Africa international rugby union player. He played as a hooker.

Rugby Union career

Amateur career

Allan was born on 25 November 1963 in Glasgow, Scotland. He lived in Scotland until he was 8 years old.

He then moved to South Africa. Allan attended Glenwood High School, where rugby first became a part of his life. In 1981, at the age of 17, he played for Glenwood High School's 1st XV.

From 1982 to 1985 he captained the Glenwood Old Boys U20 and the Natal U20 teams. From 1986 to 1987, he played for North Tvl Defence 1st XV and the South African Defence 1st XV3. Then from 1988 to 1990 he captained the Glenwood Old Boys 1st XV.

When Allan moved back to Scotland he played for Edinburgh Academicals.

He later played for London Scottish.

Provincial and professional career

Allan played for the  Natal Provincial 1st XV, and played for the South African Select XV.

In 1993 Allan was made captain of the Natal team. While with Natal, he was a part of the Currie Cup winning teams of 1992, 1995 and 1996. Between 1988 and 1997, Allan earned 126 caps for the Natal Sharks.

In Scotland, he played for the Reds Trial side in January 1990.

He played for a Presidents XV side in 1991 in a curtailed Scottish Inter-District Championship due to the Rugby World Cup.

International career

He played for Scotland 'A' in 1990 against Spain.

Between 1990 and 1991, Allan played 9 tests and 24 games for Scotland, as their hooker.

With apartheid ending in South Africa, Allan was given the chance to play for South Africa. Subsequently, between 1993 and 1996, he represented South Africa in 13 tests, also as hooker. Allan also played in 12 tour matches, scoring 6 tries for the Springboks.

He was nicknamed "Jok Bok" by his Scottish teammates and "Bokjock" by his Springbok teammates.

Test history

Coaching career

In 1997, Allan started coaching. His first stint was with London Scottish, from 1997 to 1998 where they were promoted to the Premier Division, and Allan moved on to coach the Natal Sharks forwards in 1999.

From 2000 to 2003 Allan was the Director of Coaching for the Glenwood Falcons, while also commentating on Supersport. He also worked as an advisor to the Natal Sharks from 2000 to 2001, and became their Forward Consultant in 2003.

In 2004, he was appointed the CEO of SARLA, a duty he still performs to this day. He does this, while still managing to maintain his various other positions. He is still the Director of Coaching for his club, the Glenwood Falcons, and a Supersport TV Presenter; in addition, he became the Executive Director of The eLan Rugby Legends.

Family

He is the uncle of Tommaso Allan, who played for Scotland at U-17, U-18 and U-20 and then, for the Italy national rugby union team

See also

List of South Africa national rugby union players – Springbok no. 594
List of Scotland national rugby union players – no. 866

References

External links
 John Allan international statistics

1963 births
Living people
Rugby union players from Glasgow
Scottish expatriate sportspeople in South Africa
Scottish expatriate rugby union players
Scottish rugby union coaches
South African rugby union coaches
Scottish rugby union players
South African rugby union players
Rugby union hookers
Scotland international rugby union players
South Africa international rugby union players
Reds Trial players
Edinburgh Academicals rugby union players
London Scottish F.C. players
Scotland 'A' international rugby union players